Junji Izumida (泉田純; Izumida Jun; October 28, 1965 – January 25, 2017) was a Japanese professional wrestler who  worked for Pro Wrestling Noah.

Career

Sumo wrestling
Before being a professional wrestler, Izumida was a sumo wrestler, making his debut in March 1986. He reached a highest rank of Makushita 37. He trained at Azumazeki stable and was known under three different shikona: Takamisho, Seiunryu, and finally Musashiumi. He retired from sumo in September 1991.

Professional wrestling
He debuted for All Japan Pro Wrestling at the age of twenty-six after being scouted by the company. On May 25, 1992, he wrestled his first match with Giant Baba and Rusher Kimura against Masanobu Fuchi, Haruka Eigen, and Motoshi Okuma. He then formed a team with Tamon Honda, and the two enjoyed a reign as All Asia Tag Team Champions. When Mitsuharu Misawa left AJPW in mid-2000 and formed Pro Wrestling Noah, Izumida followed. In Noah, Izumida formed the Violence Bulldogs faction with his close friend, Akira Taue. A hilarious comedy match on June 10, 2005, saw him team with fellow sumo Takeshi Rikio to defeat Jun Akiyama and (at the time) rookie Go Shiozaki in a tag team match, with the stipulation that Izumida would propose to female wrestler Mima Shimoda if he won. Shimoda proceeded to reject a kiss attempt from him. Beginning in early 2010 Izumida declared free agency to wrestle in other promotions. He made a return to All Japan on June 24, 2010, teaming with Yoshinobu Kanemaru to beat Hiroshi Yamato and Yasufumi Nakanoue in a tag team match. In his last match, on March 18, 2012, he teamed with Takao Omori and Manabu Soya to defeat Dark Cuervo, Dark Ozz and RONIN.

Death
Izumida was found dead on January 31, 2017, in his home in Kanagawa. It was determined he had died on January 25 of a heart attack.

Championships and accomplishments
All Japan Pro Wrestling
All Asia Tag Team Championship (1 time) – with Tamon Honda
January 2 Korakuen Hall Heavyweight Battle Royal Winner (1998)
International Wrestling Association of Japan
IWA Tag Team Championship (1 time) – with Shoichi Ichimiya
IWA Tag Team Title Tournament (2002) – with Shoichi Ichimiya

References

External links
Profile at Green Destiny

1965 births
2017 deaths
Japanese male professional wrestlers
Japanese sumo wrestlers
Sportspeople from Miyagi Prefecture
All Asia Tag Team Champions